The Poppy Girl's Husband is a 1919 American silent drama film directed by William S. Hart and Lambert Hillyer and written by Jules Boyle and C. Gardner Sullivan. The film stars William S. Hart, Juanita Hansen, Walter Long, Fred Starr, David Kirby and Georgie Stone. The film was released on March 16, 1919, by Paramount Pictures. A copy of the film is held in the Museum of Modern Art film archive.

Plot
As described in a film magazine, Hairpin Harry Dutton (Hart) is released from prison after serving ten years of a fourteen-year sentence. His old friend Boston Blackie (Long) takes him to San Francisco where he learns that Polly (Hansen), the wife he believed to have faithful, has divorced him and married the policeman who testified against him. He meets his ten-year-old son surreptitiously and they become great friends. Polly learns of his presence, and her husband promises to "plant a gun on him" and send him back to prison. The boy hears this and innocently tells his father in time. Harry then goes to the detective's home and is about to brand his former wife on her cheek for her faithlessness when his son intervenes and asks Harry to take him away. Harry leaves the woman unharmed and takes his son, and they find happiness in the wilderness.

Cast
William S. Hart as Hairpin Harry Dutton
Juanita Hansen as Polly Dutton
Walter Long as Boston Blackie
Fred Starr as Big Mike McCafferty 
David Kirby as The Montana Kid
Georgie Stone as Donald Dutton

References

External links 

 

1919 films
1910s English-language films
Silent American drama films
1919 drama films
Paramount Pictures films
Films directed by William S. Hart
Films directed by Lambert Hillyer
American black-and-white films
American silent feature films
Surviving American silent films
Boston Blackie films
1910s American films